The Golden Mask (zolotaya maska) is a Russian theatre festival and the National Theatre Award established in 1994 by the Theatre Union of Russia. The award is given to productions in all genres of theatre art: drama, opera, ballet, operetta and musical, and puppet theatre. It presents the most significant performances from all over Russia in Moscow in the spring of each year. The first Golden Mask award was given in 1995 presented by Union of Theatre Workers of the Russian Federation.

The President of the Award is Igor Kostolevsky (who replaced the late Georgi Taratorkin in 2017).

Categories
Drama – Best Large Scale Production
Drama – Best Small Scale Production
Drama – Best Director
Drama – Best Actress
Drama – Best Actor
Drama – Best Designer
Drama – Best Light Designer
Drama – Best Costume Designer
Puppetry – Best Production
Puppetry – Best Director
Puppetry – Best Designer
Puppetry – Best Actor
Innovation – Best Production
Opera – Best Production
Opera – Best Conductor
Opera – Best Director
Opera – Best Actress
Opera – Best Actor
Ballet – Best Production
Contemporary Dance – Best Production
Ballet/Contemporary Dance – Best Balletmaster/Best Choreographer
Ballet/Contemporary Dance – Best Actress
Ballet/Contemporary Dance – Best Actor
Operetta/Musical – Best Production
Operetta/Musical – Best Conductor
Operetta/Musical – Best Director
Operetta/Musical – Best Actress
Operetta/Musical – Best Actor
Musical theatre – Best Composer
Musical theatre – Best Designer
Musical theatre – Best Costume Designer
Musical theatre – Best Light Designer

Nominees and recipients

2012 
 Best opera production - The Tales of Hoffmann (Stanislavsky Opera)
 Best opera director - Georgy Isaakyan
 Best opera conductor - Evgeny Brazhnik
 Best opera actor - Willard White
 Best opera actress - Albina Shagimuratova
 Best composer - Leonid Desyatnikov

2013 
 Best opera production - A Midsummer Night's Dream (Stanislavsky Opera)
 Best opera director - Dmitri Tcherniakov
 Best opera conductor - Teodor Currentzis
 Best opera actor - Ildar Abdrazakov
 Best opera actress - Nadine Koutcher

2014 

 Best opera production - Eugene Onegin (Mikhailovsky Theatre)
 Best opera director - Andriy Zholdak
 Best opera conductor - Jan Latham-Koenig
 Best opera actor - Maxim Mironov
 Best opera actress - Venera Gimadieva
 Timofey Kulyabin, "Special prize"

2015 
 Best opera production - The Indian Queen (Perm Opera)
 Best opera director - Peter Sellars
 Best opera conductor - Teodor Currentzis
 Best opera actor - Dmitry Belosselskiy
 Best opera actress - Nadine Koutcher

2016 
 Best opera production - The Khovansky Affair (Stanislavsky Opera)
 Best opera director - Alexander Titel
 Best opera conductor - Andrey Lebedev
 Best opera actor - Aleksey Tatarintsev
 Best opera actress - Hibla Gerzmava

2017 
 Best opera production - Rodelinda (Bolshoi Theatre)
 Best opera director - Richard Jones
 Best opera conductor - Teodor Currentzis
 Best opera actor - Liparit Avetisyan
 Best opera actress - Nadezhda Pavlova

References

External links
 

Theatres in Russia
Soviet theatre awards
Russian theatre awards